The 2011–12 Maltese Second Division (referred to as the Bank of Valletta Second Division for sponsorship reasons) is the seventh season of the league under its current title and first season under its current league division format.

Changes from previous season 
 Attard F.C. (Promoted from 3rd Division)
 Birzebbuga St. Peters F.C. (Promoted to 1st Division)
 Gharghur F.C. (3rd Division Champions, Promoted from 3rd Division)
 Gudja United F.C. (Promoted from 3rd Division)
 Kirkop United F.C. (Promoted from 3rd Division)
 Luqa St. Andrew's F.C. (Promoted from 3rd Division)
 Mgarr United F.C. (Relegated to 3rd Division)
 Msida Saint-Joseph F.C. (Relegated from 1st Division)
 Naxxar Lions F.C. (Promoted to 1st Division)
 Rabat Ajax F.C. (2nd Division Runners-up, Promoted to 1st Division)
 Siggiewi F.C. (3rd Division Runners-up, Promoted from 3rd Division)
 St. Patrick F.C. (Promoted to 1st Division)
 St. Venera Lightning F.C. (Promoted from 3rd Division)
 Zejtun Corinthians F.C. (2nd Division Champions, Promoted to 1st Division)

Stadia

Final league table

Results

Top scorers

References

External links 
 Final League Table  
 Final Results   
 Top Scorers  

Maltese Second Division seasons
Malta
3